Marija Gorica  is a municipality in western Zagreb County of Croatia on the border with Slovenia. According to the 2001 census, there are 2,089 inhabitants, the absolute majority are Croats.

Name of the settlement is derived from the patron saint of the parish church, which is dedicated to the Assumption of the Blessed Virgin Mary. Marija is a Croatian form of the name Mary, while Gorica means "hill" (and particularly wine-growing hills). The church was founded in the 16th century as a Franciscan monastery, and its first patron saint had been Saint Peter. The change of patronage has happened in the second half of the 17th century, when a statue of the Virgin from the church altar became famous for its supposed healing powers. 

Fossilized teeth of the extinct proboscid Deinotherium (also depicted on the municipal coat of arms) were found in Marija Gorica.
In Marija Gorica Croatian writer Ante Kovačić went to school. This school is today named after him. The mayor is Marica Jančić, who was born in Žlebec Gorički.

Settlements
Marija Gorica (administrative center)
Kraj Donji
Bijela Gorica
Kraj Gornji
Žlebec Gorički
Oplaznik
Celine Goričke
Hrastina
Trstenik
Križ Brdovečki

References

External links

 

Populated places in Zagreb County
Zaprešić
Municipalities of Croatia